2016 Judo Grand Prix may refer to the following competitions:
2016 Judo Grand Prix Almaty
2016 Judo Grand Prix Budapest
2016 Judo Grand Prix Dusseldorf
2016 Judo Grand Prix Havana
2016 Judo Grand Prix Samsun
2016 Judo Grand Prix Tbilisi
2016 Judo Grand Prix Ulaanbaatar
2016 Judo Grand Prix Zagreb

 
Grand Prix